Gloria Gaynor (née Fowles; born September 7, 1943) is an American singer, best known for the disco era hits "I Will Survive" (1978), "Let Me Know (I Have a Right)" (1979), "I Am What I Am" (1983), and her version of "Never Can Say Goodbye" (1974).

Early life
Gaynor was born Gloria Fowles in Newark, New Jersey, to Daniel Fowles and Queenie Mae Proctor. Her grandmother lived nearby and was involved in her upbringing. "There was always music in our house", Gaynor wrote in her autobiography I Will Survive. She enjoyed listening to the radio, and to records by Nat King Cole and Sarah Vaughan. Her father played the ukulele and guitar and sang professionally in nightclubs with a group called Step 'n' Fetchit. Gloria grew up a tomboy; she had five brothers and one sister. Her brothers sang gospel and formed a quartet with a friend.

Gaynor was not allowed to sing with the all-male group, nor was her younger brother Arthur, as Gloria was a girl and he was too young. Arthur later acted as a tour manager for Gaynor. The family was relatively poor, but Gaynor recalls the house being filled with laughter and happiness, and the dinner table being open to neighborhood friends. They moved to a housing project in 1960, where Gaynor attended South Side High School; she graduated in 1961.

"All through my young life I wanted to sing, although nobody in my family knew it", Gaynor wrote in her autobiography. Gaynor began singing in a night club in Newark, where she was recommended to a local band by a neighbor. After several years of performing in local clubs and along the East Coast, Gaynor began her recording career in 1971 at Columbia Records.

Early career 
Gaynor was a singer with the Soul Satisfiers, a jazz and R&B music band, in the 1960s. She recorded "She'll Be Sorry/Let Me Go Baby" (for the first time as Gloria Gaynor) in 1965, for Johnny Nash's "Jocida" label. Her first real success came in 1973 when she was signed to Columbia Records by Clive Davis. The fruit of that was the release of the flop single "Honey Bee".

Moving on to MGM Records she finally hit with the album Never Can Say Goodbye, released in 1975. The first side of the album consisted of three songs ("Honey Bee", "Never Can Say Goodbye", and "Reach Out, I'll Be There"), with no break between the songs. This 19-minute dance marathon proved to be enormously popular, especially at dance clubs. All three songs were released as singles via radio edits and all of them became hits. The album was instrumental in introducing disco music to the public, "Never Can Say Goodbye" becoming the first song to top Billboard magazine's dance chart. It was also a hit on the mainstream Pop Charts, peaking at No. 9, and on the R&B Charts, reaching No. 34 (the original version by The Jackson 5 had been a No. 2 hit on the Hot 100 in 1971). It also marked her first significant chart success internationally, making it into the Top 5 in Australia, Canada, Germany and the UK. The song would go on to be certified silver by the British Phonographic Industry, and subsequently gold in the US.

Capitalizing on the success of her first album, Gaynor quickly released her follow-up, Experience Gloria Gaynor, later that same year. Some of her lesser-known singles, due to lack of recurrent airplay—including "Honey Bee" (1974), "Casanova Brown" (1975), and "Let's Make a Deal" (1976), as well as her cover of the Four Tops' "Reach Out, I'll Be There"—became hits in nightclubs and reached the Top 5 on Billboards disco charts. Many charted on the Hot 100 and R&B charts as well, with songs like "(If You Want It) Do It Yourself"—a No. 1 disco hit—peaking at No. 98 on the Pop Charts and No. 24 on the R&B Charts. Gaynor's cover of "How High the Moon" topped the US Dance Charts, and made the lower parts of both the pop and R&B charts, as well as achieving some international chart success. After her 1976 album I've Got You, Gaynor shifted from her hit production team to work with other producers. She has recorded some 16 albums since, including one in England, one in Germany, and two in Italy.

Major mainstream breakthrough

In the next few years, Gaynor released two albums Glorious and Gloria Gaynor's Park Avenue Sound, but would only enjoy a few more moderate hits. However, in late 1978, with the release of her album Love Tracks, she climbed the pop charts again with her smash hit single "I Will Survive". The lyrics of this song were written from the point of view of a woman, recently dumped, telling her former lover that she can cope without him and does not want anything more to do with him. The song has become something of an anthem of female emancipation. Originally, "I Will Survive" was a B-side when Polydor Records released it in late 1978. The A-side, a song called "Substitute", then a recent worldwide hit for South African girl-group Clout, was considered more "radio friendly". Boston disco radio DJ Jack King turned the record over and recalls being stunned by what he heard: "I couldn't believe they were burying this monster hit on the B-side", stated King. "I played it and played it and my listeners went nuts!". The massive audience response forced the record company to flip the songs, so that subsequent copies of the single listed the more popular song on the A-side. King was honored at New York's Disco Masters Awards Show for three consecutive years (1979–1981) in recognition of his relentless push of the song. He was also named "Most Influential Radio Personality of the Year" (1980) by Rock & Records magazine. Gaynor and King each received a Grammy Award for Best Disco Recording in 1980, the only year that award was given (Gloria had to wait another 40 years for her second Grammy, in the Grammy Award for Best Roots Gospel Album category). It is ranked No. 492 on Rolling Stones list of "The 500 Greatest Songs of All Time", and ranked at No. 97 on Billboard magazine's "All-Time Hot 100". In 2000, the song was ranked No. 1 in VH1's list of the "100 Greatest Dance Songs of All Time" and remains there to this day.

As a disco number, the song was unique for its time by virtue of Gaynor's having no background singers or lush production. And, unlike her first disco hits, the track was not pitched up to make it faster and to render Gaynor's recorded voice in a higher register than that in which she actually sang. Most disco hits at the time were heavily produced, with multiple voices, orchestrations, overdubs, and adjustments to pitch and speed. "I Will Survive" had a much sparer and "cleaner" sound. Had it been originally planned and released as an A-side, it would almost certainly have undergone a substantially more heavy-handed remix. In late 1979, she released the album I Have a Right which contained her next disco hit, "Let Me Know (I Have a Right)",  which featured Doc Severinsen of The Tonight Show fame, playing a trumpet solo. Gaynor also recorded a disco song called "Love Is Just a Heartbeat Away" in 1979 for the cult vampire film Nocturna: Granddaughter of Dracula, which featured a number of disco songs.

Stateside career
In 1980 and again in 1981, Gaynor released two disco albums which were virtually ignored in the United States due to the backlash against disco, which began late in 1979. The album's singles barely registered on urban contemporary radio, where disco music remained popular. In 1982, having looked into a wide variety of faiths and religious movements, she became a Christian and began to distance herself from a past she considered to be sinful. That same year, she released an album of mid-tempo R&B and pop-style songs entitled Gloria Gaynor.

Gaynor would achieve her final success in the 1980s with the release of her album I Am Gloria Gaynor in 1984. This was mainly due to the song "I Am What I Am", which became a hit at dance clubs, and then on the Club Play chart in late 1983/early 1984. "I Am What I Am" became a gay anthem and made Gaynor a gay icon. Her 1986 album, The Power of Gloria Gaynor, was almost entirely composed of cover versions of other songs that were popular at the time.

Career revival

Gaynor's career received a revitalizing spark in the early and mid 1990s with the worldwide disco revival movement. During the late 1990s, she dabbled in acting for a while, guest starring on The Wayans Bros, That '70s Show (singing "I Will Survive"), and Ally McBeal, before doing a limited engagement performance in Broadway's Smokey Joe's Cafe. In 2001, Gaynor performed "I Will Survive" at the 30th Anniversary concert for Michael Jackson.

Gaynor returned to the recording studio in 2002, releasing her first album in over 15 years, I Wish You Love. The two singles released from the album, "Just Keep Thinking About You" and "I Never Knew", both topped Billboard's Hot Dance Music/Club Play. Both singles also secured moderate to heavy dance format radio airplay. The latter song also charted No. 30 on Billboard's Adult Contemporary chart. In 2004, Gaynor re-released her 1997 album The Answer (also released under the title What a Life) as a follow up to her successful album I Wish You Love. The album includes her club hit "Oh, What a Life".

In late 2002, Gaynor appeared with R&B stars on the "Rhythm, Love, and Soul" edition of the PBS series American Soundtrack. Her performance of the disco hit "I Will Survive" and new single "I Never Knew" was included on the accompanying live album that was released in 2004.

On September 19, 2005, Gaynor was honored twice when she and her music were inducted into the Dance Music Hall of Fame, in the "Artist" category, along with fellow disco artists Chic and Sylvester. Her classic anthem "I Will Survive" was inducted under the "Records" category. In January 2008, the American Diabetes Association named Gaynor the Honorary Spokesperson of the 2008 "NYC Step Out to Fight Diabetes Walk".

More television appearances followed in the late 2000s with 2009 appearances on The John Kerwin Show, The Wendy Williams Show, and The View to promote the 30th anniversary of "I Will Survive". In 2010, she appeared on Last Comic Standing and The Tonight Show.

Forty years after its release, Gaynor continues to ride the success of "I Will Survive", touring the country and the world over and performing her signature song on dozens of TV shows. A few successful remixes of the song during the 1990s and 2000s along with new versions of the song by Lonnie Gordon, Diana Ross, Chantay Savage, rock group Cake and others, as well as constant recurrent airplay on nearly all soft AC and rhythmic format radio stations have helped to keep the song in the mainstream. Gaynor said of her biggest hit in a 2012 interview: "It feels great to have such a song like that because I get kids five and six years old telling me they like the song, and then people seventy-five and eighty. It's quite an honor." The song was revived yet again in 2015 for the film The Martian, where it is used at the end as the credits roll.

Gaynor released a contemporary Christian album in late 2013.

On May 16, 2015, Gaynor was awarded the honorary degree of Doctor of Music by Dowling College. In 2017, she made a cameo appearance as a flight attendant in a Capital One commercial, while Samuel L. Jackson, Charles Barkley, and Spike Lee sang "I Will Survive".

In 2016, "I Will Survive" was selected for induction into the Library of Congress' National Recording Registry.

On May 6, 2017, Gaynor performed with her band at the Library of Congress' celebration of disco music at Bibliodiscotheque, a disco dance party in the Great Hall of the Thomas Jefferson Building.

Due to the devastation wreaked by Hurricane Harvey on the state of Texas in August 2017, Gaynor rewrote the lyrics to "I Will Survive", changing the title to "Texas Will Survive", and posted a video of herself singing the song on Twitter on August 30, 2017.

In December 2019 "I Will Survive" trended on TikTok and Gaynor performed the dance at the LifeMinute TV studios in Times Square, NY.

In January 2020, she won her second Grammy Award in her career, 40 years after her first, for her roots gospel album Testimony.

In 2021, Gaynor returned to disco music when she recorded "Can’t Stop Writing Songs About You" with Australian singer Kylie Minogue for the reissue of Minogue's fifteenth studio album Disco entitled Disco: Guest List Edition. The collaboration occurred following Gaynor praising Minogue for keeping Disco alive with her album of the same name.

In April 2021, Gaynor recorded "Brand New" with the veteran Contemporary Christian band MercyMe.

In 2022, Gaynor competed in season eight of The Masked Singer as "Mermaid" who rode on a giant clam-like vehicle that the Men in Black had to push around. After being eliminated on "Andrew Lloyd Webber Night" alongside Mario Cantone as "Maize", Gaynor did her performance of "I Will Survive".

Personal life
Gaynor married her manager Linwood Simon in 1979. The couple divorced in 2005. She has no children. According to Gaynor, while she always wanted children, her ex-husband never desired any.

Discography

Never Can Say Goodbye (1975)
Experience Gloria Gaynor (1975)
I've Got You (1976)
Glorious (1977)
Gloria Gaynor's Park Avenue Sound (1978)
Love Tracks (1978)
I Have a Right (1979)
Stories (1980)
I Kinda Like Me (1981)
Gloria Gaynor (1982)
I Am Gloria Gaynor (1984)
The Power of Gloria Gaynor (1986)
Love Affair (1992)
I'll Be There (1994)
The Answer (1997)
I Wish You Love (2003)
I Will Survive (2013)
Testimony (2019)

See also
List of artists who reached number one on the Hot 100 (U.S.)
List of artists who reached number one on the U.S. Dance chart
List of number-one dance hits (United States)
List of number-one hits (United States)
List of best-selling singles

References

External links

  
 
 
 Gloria Gaynor interview

1943 births
Living people
20th-century African-American women singers
21st-century African-American women singers
African-American Christians
African-American actresses
American hi-NRG musicians
American dance musicians
American disco musicians
American disco singers
American film actresses
American house musicians
American mezzo-sopranos
American soul singers
American television actresses
American women in electronic music
American women pop singers
Grammy Award winners
Malcolm X Shabazz High School alumni
Musicians from Newark, New Jersey
New Jersey Hall of Fame inductees
People from Cliffside Park, New Jersey
People from Green Brook Township, New Jersey